Dzyunashogh (anglicized: Gizil Shafag) is a town in the Lori Province of Armenia near the Armenia–Georgia border. The village was populated by Azerbaijanis before they were forcefully expelled after the outbreak of the Nagorno-Karabakh conflict.

History 
Between May and July 1989, the Azerbaijani population of Gizil Shafag were subject to an unusual village exchange with the then-Armenian population of Karkanj in Azerbaijan.

References

External links 

Populated places in Lori Province